Eldonia is an extinct soft-bodied cambroernid animal of unknown affinity, best known from the Fossil Ridge outcrops of the Burgess Shale, particularly in the 'Great Eldonia layer' in the Walcott Quarry. In addition to the 550 collected by Walcott, 224 specimens of Eldonia are known from the Greater Phyllopod bed, where they comprise 0.43% of the community.  Species also occur in the Chengjiang biota, Siberia, and in Upper Ordovician strata of Morocco.

Walcott's original interpretation as a holothurian was rapidly disputed.  Alternative affinities to be suggested, which did not stand the test of time, included the siphonophores and a coelenterate medusa.

It takes the form of a round, medusoid disk (which originally led to suggestions of a jellyfish affinity) with a C-shaped gut trace.  The gut is recalcitrant and can be extracted using Hydrofluoric acid.  The organism is frequently found in association with the lobopod Microdictyon, which is presumed to have fed on Eldonia.

The eldoniids form a clade that also includes Paropsonema, Rotadiscus, and Stellostomites.

References

External links

Prehistoric animal genera
Burgess Shale fossils
Middle Ordovician genus extinctions
Wheeler Shale
Cambrian genus extinctions
Ordovician genus extinctions